Zohra (Arabic: زهرة, Persian: زهره) may refer to:

People

Given name
Zohra Al Fassiya (1905-1994), Moroccan singer and poet
Zohra Begum Kazi (1912–2007), Bangladeshi physician and activist
Zohra Bensalem (born 1990), Algerian volleyball player
Zohra Daoud (born 1954), American TV celebrity and model
Zohra Drif (born 1934), Algerian politician and lawyer
Zohra Lampert (born 1937), American actress
Zehra Nigah (born 1937), Urdu poet from Pakistan
Zohra Sarwari, Muslim American author, business coach, entrepreneur
Zohra Sehgal (born 1912), Indian stage and film actress
Zohra Aghamirova (born 2001), Azerbaijani rhythmic gymnast

Middle name
Fatima Zohra Cherif (born 1986), Algerian volleyball player
Fatima Zohra Karadja (born 1949), Algerian Vice-President for the African Union's Economic, Social and Cultural Council for Northern Africa
Fatima-Zohra Oukazi (born 1984), Algerian volleyball player

Surname
Lalla Fatima Zohra (1929–2014), eldest daughter of King Mohammed V of Morocco

Other uses
 Zohra (film), a 1922 film
 Zohra Orchestra, Afghan women’s orchestra

See also
 
Zahra (disambiguation)

Pakistani feminine given names